Rodolfo Ostromann (22 December 1903 – 5 September 1960) was an Austrian professional footballer, who played as a striker.

External links 
Profile at MagliaRossonera.it 

1903 births
1960 deaths
Austrian footballers
Austrian expatriate footballers
Austrian expatriate sportspeople in Italy
Association football forwards
Serie A players
A.C. Milan players
U.S. Triestina Calcio 1918 players
A.C. Legnano players
Cagliari Calcio players